Sibille is both a surname and a given name. Notable people with the name include:

Surname:
Constance Sibille (born 1990), French tennis player
Madeleine Sibille (1895–1984), French opera singer
Pietro Sibille (born 1977), Peruvian actor
Ray Sibille (born 1952), American jockey
Roselyne Sibille (born 1953), French poet

Given name:
Sibille Attar (born 1981), Swedish singer of French origin

See also
Sibyl (disambiguation)
Cybil (disambiguation)
Sibylla (disambiguation)
Sibylle (disambiguation)